The Cat's Eye Nebula (also known as NGC 6543 and Caldwell 6) is a planetary nebula in the northern constellation of Draco, discovered by William Herschel on February 15, 1786. It was the first planetary nebula whose spectrum was investigated by the English amateur astronomer William Huggins, demonstrating that planetary nebulae were gaseous and not stellar in nature. Structurally, the object has had high-resolution images by the Hubble Space Telescope revealing knots, jets, bubbles and complex arcs, being illuminated by the central hot planetary nebula nucleus (PNN).
It is a well-studied object that has been observed from radio to X-ray wavelengths.

General information
NGC 6543 is a high northern declination deep-sky object. It has the combined magnitude of 8.1, with high surface brightness. Its small bright inner nebula subtends an average of 16.1 arcsec, with the outer prominent condensations about 25 arcsec. Deep images reveal an extended halo about 300 arcsec or 5 arcminutes across, that was once ejected by the central progenitor star during its red giant phase.

It is a convenient and accurate marker for the axis of rotation of the Earth's ecliptic, around which the celestial North Pole rotates. It is also a good marker for the nearby "invariable" axis of the solar system, which is the center of the circles which every planet's north pole, and the north pole of every planet's orbit, make in the sky. Since motion in the sky of the ecliptic pole is very slow compared to the motion of the Earth's north pole, its position as an ecliptic pole station marker is essentially permanent on the time-scale of human history, as opposed to the pole star, which changes every few thousand years.

Stellar classification is O7 + [WR]-type star. Calculations suggest the PNN is over one solar mass, from a theoretical initial 5 solar masses. The Cat's Eye Nebula, given in some sources, lies about three thousand light-years from Earth.

Observations
The Cat's Eye was the first planetary nebula to be observed with a spectroscope by William Huggins on August 29, 1864. Huggins' observations revealed that the nebula's spectrum was non-continuous and made of a few bright emission lines, first indication that planetary nebulae consist of tenuous ionised gas. Spectroscopic observations at these wavelengths are used in abundance determinations, while images at these wavelengths have been used to reveal the intricate structure of the nebula.

Infrared observations
Observations of NGC 6543 at far-infrared wavelengths (about 60 μm) reveal the presence of stellar dust at low temperatures. The dust is believed to have formed during the last phases of the progenitor star's life. It absorbs light from the central star and re-radiates it at infrared wavelengths. The spectrum of the infrared dust emission implies that the dust temperature is about 85 K, while the mass of the dust is estimated at  solar masses.

Infrared emission also reveals the presence of un-ionised material such as molecular hydrogen (H2) and argon. In many planetary nebulae, molecular emission is greatest at larger distances from the star, where more material is un-ionised, but molecular hydrogen emission in NGC 6543 seems to be bright at the inner edge of its outer halo. This may be due to shock waves exciting the H2 as ejecta moving at different speeds collide. The overall appearance of the Cat's Eye Nebula in infrared (wavelengths 2–8 μm) is similar in visible light.

Optical and ultraviolet observations
The Hubble Space Telescope image produced here is in false colour, designed to highlight regions of high and low ionisation. Three images were taken, in filters isolating the light emitted by singly ionised hydrogen at 656.3 nm, singly ionised nitrogen at 658.4 nm and doubly ionised oxygen at 500.7 nm. The images were combined as red, green and blue channels respectively, although their true colours are red, red and green. The image reveals two "caps" of less ionised material at the edge of the nebula.

X-ray observations

It is thought that the very hot gas results from the violent interaction of a fast stellar wind with material previously ejected. This interaction has hollowed out the inner bubble of the nebula. Chandra observations have also revealed a point source at the position of the central star. The spectrum of this source extends to the hard part of the X-ray spectrum, to 0.5–. A star with the photospheric temperature of about  would not be expected to emit strongly in hard X-rays, and so their presence is something of a mystery. It may suggest the presence of a high temperature accretion disk within a binary star system. The hard X-ray data remain intriguing more than ten years later: the Cat's Eye was included in a 2012 Chandra survey of 21 central stars of planetary nebulae (CSPNe) in the solar neighborhood, which found: "All but one of the X-ray point sources detected at CSPNe display X-ray spectra that are harder than expected from hot (~) central star photospheres, possibly indicating a high frequency of binary companions to CSPNe. Other potential explanations include self-shocking winds or PN mass fallback."

Distance
Planetary nebulae distances like NGC 6543 are generally very inaccurate and not well known. Some recent Hubble Space Telescope observations of NGC 6543 taken several years apart determine its distance from the angular expansion rate of 3.457 milliarcseconds per year. Assuming a line of sight expansion velocity of 16.4 km·s−1, this implies that NGC 6543's distance is  parsecs ( or  light-years) away from Earth. Several other distance references, like what is quoted in SIMBAD in 2014 based on Stanghellini, L., et al. (2008) suggest the distance is  parsecs ( light-years).

Age
The angular expansion of the nebula can also be used to estimate its age. If it has been expanding at a constant rate of 10 milliarcseconds a year, then it would take  to reach a diameter of 20 arcseconds. This may be an upper limit to the age, because ejected material will be slowed when it encounters material ejected from the star at earlier stages of its evolution, and the interstellar medium.

Composition

Like most astronomical objects, NGC 6543 consists mostly of hydrogen and helium, with heavier elements present in small quantities. The exact composition may be determined by spectroscopic studies. Abundances are generally expressed relative to hydrogen, the most abundant element.

Different studies generally find varying values for elemental abundances. This is often because spectrographs attached to telescopes do not collect all the light from objects being observed, instead gathering light from a slit or small aperture. Therefore, different observations may sample different parts of the nebula.

These are fairly typical abundances for planetary nebulae, with the carbon, nitrogen and oxygen abundances all larger than the values found for the sun, due to the effects of nucleosynthesis enriching the star's atmosphere in heavy elements before it is ejected as a planetary nebula.

Deep spectroscopic analysis of NGC 6543 may indicate that the nebula contains a small amount of material which is highly enriched in heavy elements; this is discussed below.

Kinematics and morphology
The Cat's Eye Nebula is structurally a very complex nebula, and the mechanism or mechanisms that have given rise to its complicated morphology are not well understood. The central bright part of the nebula consists of the inner elongated bubble (inner ellipse) filled with hot gas. It, in turn, is nested into a pair of larger spherical bubbles conjoined together along their waist. The waist is observed as the second larger ellipse lying perpendicular to the bubble with hot gas.

The structure of the bright portion of the nebula is primarily caused by the interaction of a fast stellar wind being emitted by the central PNN with the visible material ejected during the formation of the nebula. This interaction causes the emission of X-rays discussed above.

It is also suspected that the central WR:+O7 spectral class PNN star, HD 164963 / BD +66 1066 / PPM 20679 of the nebula may be generated by a binary star. The existence of an accretion disk caused by mass transfer between the two components of the system may give rise to polar jets, which would interact with previously ejected material. Over time, the direction of the polar jets would vary due to precession.

Outside the bright inner portion of the nebula, there are a series of concentric rings, thought to have been ejected before the formation of the planetary nebula, while the star was on the asymptotic giant branch of the Hertzsprung–Russell diagram. These rings are very evenly spaced, suggesting that the mechanism responsible for their formation ejected them at very regular intervals and at very similar speeds. The total mass of the rings is about 0.1 solar masses. The pulsations that formed the rings probably started 15,000 years ago and ceased about  years ago, when the formation of the bright central part began (see above).

Further, a large faint halo extends to large distances from the star. The halo again predates the formation of the main nebula. The mass of the halo is estimated as 0.26–0.92 solar masses.

See also
List of largest nebulae

Notes

References

Cited sources

External links

 Cat's Eye Nebula Release at ESA/Hubble
 Cat's Eye Nebula images at ESA/Hubble
 Chandra X-Ray Observatory Photo Album: NGC 6543
 Astronomy Picture of the Day
 The Cat's Eye Nebula October 31, 1999
 Halo of the Cat's Eye 2010 May 9
 The Cat's Eye Nebula 2016 July 3
 Hubble Probes the Complex History of a Dying Star—HubbleSite article about the Cat's Eye Nebula.
 NGC6543 The Cats Eye Nebula
 Hubble's Color Toolbox: Cat's Eye Nebula—article showing image composite process used to produce an image of the nebula
 
 Cat's Eye Nebula at Constellation Guide
 Cat's Eye Nebula in the Staracle NGC catalog

 SEDS – NGC 6543

006b
Draco (constellation)
NGC objects
Planetary nebulae
Astronomical objects discovered in 1786
Discoveries by William Herschel